Stanton Lewis (born 3 August 1987) is South African retired international soccer player  who played as a striker.

Early and personal life 
Born in Johannesburg, Lewis has a son, born on 2 September 2008.

Club career 
Lewis began his youth career with Orlando Pirates, and also played for Wits University before moving to Ajax Cape Town in 2002. He made his professional league debut in 2005, and made a total of sixteen league appearances – scoring one goal – for Ajax Cape Town.

Lewis signed for Ajax of the Netherlands in July 2006, on a four-year contract. However, he never made a first-team appearance for Ajax, and he returned to Ajax Cape Town in January 2009, on an 18-month loan deal. The deal was made permanent in July 2010, and later that month Lewis went on trial with Swedish club Djurgården.

In January 2011, Lewis moved on loan to Kaizer Chiefs, following a bust-up with Ajax Cape Town manager Foppe de Haan, and Lewis has publicly announced that he would like to turn the loan deal into a permanent contract.

Rather than remaining with Kaizer Chiefs, Lewis signed a two-year deal with AmaZulu.

Lewis moved to Golden Arrows on 13 June 2012, signing a two-year deal, before moving to Chippa United in 2013.

International career 
Lewis represented the South African national team at the 2007 COSAFA Cup, making two appearances as a substitute.

References

1987 births
Living people
South African soccer players
South Africa international soccer players
South African expatriate soccer players
Association football forwards
Orlando Pirates F.C. players
Cape Town Spurs F.C. players
AFC Ajax players
Expatriate footballers in the Netherlands
South African expatriate sportspeople in the Netherlands
AmaZulu F.C. players
Lamontville Golden Arrows F.C. players
Soccer players from Johannesburg
Chippa United F.C. players